Julio Olalla (born October 27, 1945, in Santiago de Chile) is a former English and Spanish-speaking Chilean government lawyer and current president of The Newfield Network, a consulting company and coaching school in the United States and Latin America.

Career 
He worked in the government of the Chilean president Salvador Allende before spending four years in exile in Argentina before emigrating to the United States in 1978 with his family. He began working with his former teacher and another former cabinet minister of president Salvador Allende, Fernando Flores. 

In the United States, Olalla founded The Newfield Network in 1991 to promote ontological coaching. Notable clients include former Chilean president Michelle Bachelet and her cabinet, with which he worked in 2006.

He stays in Boulder, Colorado, and travels the world for work. His wise view of the world makes him a famous adviser of Fortune 500 or Global 500 companies.

Olalla has taught thousands as a motivational speaker, helping people with organization, leadership, emotion, education, learning, and coaching.

He is the author of a 2004 ebook titled "From Knowledge to Wisdom", and several CDs on topics including ontological coaching and moods and emotions as fields of learning.

References

1945 births
Living people
Chilean emigrants to the United States
People from Santiago